"Failure" is a song by American rock band Breaking Benjamin. The song was released on March 23, 2015 as the lead single on the band's fifth studio album, Dark Before Dawn. The track marks the band's first release since the start of an extended hiatus entered upon in mid-2010, and is also the first recording to feature a different lineup alongside singer, writer, and guitarist Benjamin Burnley. The track is their third single to reach No. 1 on the Mainstream Rock Tracks chart, after "Breath" (2006) and "I Will Not Bow" (2009), and spent nine weeks there. On January 9, 2017, the single was certified Gold by the RIAA.

Music
Loudwires Chad Childers stated the song is "stylistically true" to the band's past content, and Dominique Kollie of Moargeek said "the song features the band's signature sound of metal-driven riffs coupled with soft hooks that maintain its angst-filled energy." At MusicSnake, it is stated as "sure to catch the interest of alternative rock fans". Metal Insider's Bran Teitelman associates the song with "the band's melodic mainstream hard rock".

Release
On March 12, 2015, Breaking Benjamin released a 15-second teaser of "Failure", though its name was not confirmed until March 18, when it was formally announced via K-SHE '95. On March 23, it became available as an automatic download with the pre-order of Dark Before Dawn, but was also dispersed via rock radio and other media. A lyric video and official music video for the song was released via Vevo on May 15 and June 26, respectively.

Personnel
Band
 Benjamin Burnley – lead vocals, rhythm guitar
 Jasen Rauch – lead guitar
 Keith Wallen – rhythm guitar, backing vocals
 Aaron Bruch – bass, backing vocals
 Shaun Foist – drums, percussion

 Production
 Benjamin Burnley – composer, producer
 Ted Jensen – mastering
 Digital editing/engineering John Bender
 Jim Romano
 Dan Korneff
 Mixing'
 Chris Lord-Alge
 Ben Grosse
 Keith Armstrong
 Nik Harpen

Charts

Weekly charts

Year-end charts

Certifications

References

2015 singles
2015 songs
Breaking Benjamin songs
Hollywood Records singles
Songs written by Benjamin Burnley